Juan Pablo Passaglia (born 24 May 1989) is an Argentine professional footballer who plays as midfielder for Primera Nacional club Agropecuario.

Honours

Juventud Unida Universitario
Torneo Federal A: 2015

CA Barracas Central
Primera B Metropolitana: 2018–19

References

External links
 

1989 births
Living people
Footballers from Rosario, Santa Fe
Argentine people of Italian descent
Argentine footballers
Association football midfielders
Argentine expatriate footballers
Defensores de Belgrano footballers
San Martín de San Juan footballers
Racing Club de Avellaneda footballers
Club Atlético River Plate footballers
Deportes La Serena footballers
Universidad de Chile footballers
Chilean Primera División players
Liga I players
FC Politehnica Iași (2010) players
FC UTA Arad players
AFC Chindia Târgoviște players
Primera Nacional players
Club Agropecuario Argentino players
Expatriate footballers in Chile
Argentine expatriate sportspeople in Chile
Expatriate footballers in Spain
Argentine expatriate sportspeople in Spain
Expatriate footballers in Romania
Argentine expatriate sportspeople in Romania